Phi Delta Delta was a women's professional law fraternity founded in November 1911 at the University of Southern California. It merged with Phi Alpha Delta in 1972.

History
Phi Delta Delta Legal Sorority was founded at the Law School of the University of Southern California on November 11, 1911. Its founders were Georgia Bullock, Gladys Morre Brown, Sarah Patten Doherty, Annette Fillius Hunley, and Vere Radir-Norton. Its purpose was "to promote a higher standard of professional ethics and culture among women in law schools and the legal profession." Phi Delta Delta Legal Fraternity was incorporated as a nonprofit corporation in California on October 25, 1912.

The fraternity went national with the opening of its Beta chapter at the Washington College of Law and Gamma chapter at the Chicago-Kent College of Law in April 1913. This was followed by the Delta chapter at the University of Oregon Law School in 1914. Phi Delta Delta held its first national convention in Los Angeles on August 20–22, 1917 with delegates from Alpha, Delta, and Epsilon chapters.

The fraternity's publication was The Phi Delta Delta. It was established at the fraternity's first convention in 1917 as an annual publication. Initially, it was called Oak Leaves and was edited by a  member of the Zeta chapter. At the fraternity's second convention, the publication's frequency was changed to semiannual, along with the name change to The Phi Delta Delta. Its frequency became quarterly after the fraternity's third convention in 1924.

Phi Delta Delta became an international fraternity in 1926 with the establishment of the Omega chapter at the Vancouver School of Law in Vancouver, Canada in January 1926. It also added chapters in Cuba, England, and South America. By March of 1926, it was the largest legal sorority in the United States. The fraternity eventually expanded to include 5,000 members and 68 chapters in the United States and Canada.

Phi Delta Delta created an endowment fund that provided loans to students in their last year of law school. In addition, it provided scholarship keys at graduation for scholastic excellence in law school.

Each year at the American Bar Association conference, Phi Delta Delta sponsored a breakfast for deans of law schools, judges, prominent members of the association, and fraternity members. The fraternity also had a speakers bureau on its research interests, including coordinating council movement, juvenile delinquency, legislation impacting women, the probation and parole system, restatement of the law, and taxation.

Merger 
In 1970, the all-male legal fraternity Phi Alpha Delta amended its constitution to accept female members. In 1971, Phi Delta Delta began negotiating a merger with Phi Alpha Delta. Both fraternities held conventions in San Diego on August 9–12, 1972. Phi Delta Delta and Phi Alpha Delta reached a merger agreement on August 12, 1972. At this time, all members of Phi Delta Delta became members of Phi Alpha Delta. Its chapters were renamed when they merged into Phi Alpha Delta.

Archival records of Phi Alpha Delta are stored in the special collections of the Charles E. Young Research Library at the University of California, Los Angeles, and the Washburn University School of Law.

Symbols 
The colors of Phi Delta Delta were old rose and violet. Its official flowers were the rose and the violet. Its jewel was the pearl.

Chapters

Collegiate chapters 
Following is a list of Phi Delta Delta collegiate chapters. Status is as of the time of the merger in 1972. All chapters are now inactive, most having merged into Phi Alpha Delta.

Alumnae chapters 
Following is a list of Phi Delta Delta alumnae chapters. Status is as of the time of the merger in 1972. All chapters are now inactive, due to the merger with Phi Alpha Delta.

Notable members

See also 
 Professional fraternities and sororities

 Order of the Coif (honor society, law)
 The Order of Barristers (honor society, law; litigation)
 Alpha Phi Sigma (honor society, criminal justice)
 Lambda Epsilon Chi (honor society, paralegal)

References

Professional legal fraternities and sororities in the United States
Student organizations established in 1911
Legal organizations based in the United States
Former members of Professional Fraternity Association
1911 establishments in California